Chinapandraka is a village in Kruthivennu mandal, located in Krishna district of the Indian state of Andhra Pradesh.

References 

Villages in Krishna district